Carl David Muggleton (born 13 September 1968) is an English professional football goalkeeper who made over 550 appearances in the Football League and Scottish Premier League for a number of clubs, most notably Leicester City, Stoke City, Celtic, Chesterfield and Mansfield Town.

Playing career
Muggleton began his career in 1986 as an apprentice at Leicester City, where he made 54 first-team appearances in all competitions in seven years. He also had loan spells at Chesterfield, Blackpool, Hartlepool United, Stockport County, Liverpool, Stoke City and Sheffield United during his tenure at Filbert Street. He played for Leicester in the 1992 Second Division play-off final against Blackburn Rovers, when he saved a penalty at Wembley Stadium but finished on the losing side.

In January 1994, Muggleton was signed by Scottish club, Celtic, for whom he made 13 appearances in the remainder of the 1993–94 season, before joining Stoke City in the summer of 1994 for a fee of £150,000. In a seven-year spell at Stoke, Muggleton played more than 170 games. He was also loaned to Rotherham, Sheffield United, Chesterfield, Mansfield Town and Cardiff City. Muggleton was released by Stoke in the summer of 2001 and joined Cheltenham. However, he was kept out of the side by Steve Book and after a one-month loan at Bradford City, he was allowed to leave the club, and join Chesterfield in May 2002, where manager Dave Rushbury described him as, "...a mature goalkeeper who will provide the voice of experience behind our younger defenders."

Muggleton played over 120 games for Chesterfield during his four-year stay with the club. He signed a new two-year contract in May 2004, but left Chesterfield by mutual consent in March 2006, and joined local rivals Mansfield Town in July 2006 to provide cover for first-choice goalkeeper Jason White. He made 21 appearances for Mansfield in the 2006–07 season, and was offered a new contract in May 2007. After Mansfield Town were relegated to the Conference National at the end of the 2007–08 season, he was released by the club.

At international level, Muggleton played once for England Under-21, in a match against France in 1990.

Coaching career
After leaving Mansfield Town, he joined Notts County in July 2008 as a part-time goalkeeping coach. On 23 July 2012 he joined Gillingham as their goalkeeping coach, a role he then took up at Barnet in July 2016. He then took up the position of goalkeeper coach and head of recruitment at Chesterfield in May 2018, but left on 27 December after Martin Allen was sacked.

Personal life
After ending his playing career Muggleton became a driving instructor in the Leicestershire area. His son Sam is also a professional footballer.

Career statistics
Source:

References

External links
 

1968 births
Living people
Footballers from Leicester
English footballers
Association football goalkeepers
England under-21 international footballers
Leicester City F.C. players
Chesterfield F.C. players
Blackpool F.C. players
Hartlepool United F.C. players
Stockport County F.C. players
Liverpool F.C. players
Stoke City F.C. players
Sheffield United F.C. players
Celtic F.C. players
Rotherham United F.C. players
Mansfield Town F.C. players
Cardiff City F.C. players
Cheltenham Town F.C. players
Bradford City A.F.C. players
Barnet F.C. non-playing staff
Chesterfield F.C. non-playing staff
Gillingham F.C. non-playing staff
Notts County F.C. non-playing staff
English Football League players
Scottish Football League players